The Captain William Clark Monument, also known as Naming of Mt. Jefferson, is an outdoor monument commemorating William Clark by art professor Michael Florin Dente, installed on the University of Portland campus, in Portland, Oregon, United States.

Description and history
The memorial was dedicated on December 11, 1988, and features  bronze sculptures of Clark, York, who was Clark's slave, and an unnamed Native American on a  cement and stone base.

In 2020, during the anti-racism protests in the weeks after the police murder of George Floyd, the statue of York was removed.

See also

 1988 in art
 Lewis and Clark (sculpture), Salem

References

1988 establishments in Oregon
1988 sculptures
Black people in art
Bronze sculptures in Oregon
Cultural depictions of Meriwether Lewis and William Clark
Lewis and Clark Expedition
Monuments and memorials in Portland, Oregon
Monuments and memorials removed during the George Floyd protests
Clark, William
Outdoor sculptures in Portland, Oregon
Sculptures of African Americans
Sculptures of men in Oregon
Sculptures of Native Americans in Oregon
Statues in Portland, Oregon
University of Portland campus
Statues removed in 2020